Otlja is a village in the municipality of Lipkovo, North Macedonia.

Demographics
According to the statistics of Bulgarian ethnographer Vasil Kanchov from 1900, 490 inhabitants lived in Otlja, 250 Albanian Muslims, 200 Romani and 40 Christian Bulgarians. As of the 2021 census, Otlja had 2,538 residents with the following ethnic composition:
Albanians 2,485
Persons for whom data are taken from administrative sources 52
Others 1

According to the 2002 census, the village had a total of 3148 inhabitants. Ethnic groups in the village include:

Albanians  3137
Macedonians 0
Others 8

References

External links

Villages in Lipkovo Municipality
Albanian communities in North Macedonia